The women's 100 metres event at the 1959 Pan American Games was held at the Soldier Field in Chicago on 29 and 30 August.

Medalists

Results

Heats
Held on 29 August

Wind:Heat 1: +1.6 m/s, Heat 2: +2.6 m/s, Heat 3: +2.5 m/s, Heat 4: +2.0 m/s

Semifinals
Held on 29 August

Wind:Heat 1: +0.9 m/s, Heat 2: +1.8 m/s

Final
Held on 30 August

Wind: -1.1 m/s

References

Athletics at the 1959 Pan American Games
1959